Kathryn Rowan (born 16 December 1996) is an Australian representative rower. She has represented at underage and senior World Championships.

Club and state rowing
Rowan was raised in Queensland  and attended St Peters Lutheran College in Brisbane. Her senior club rowing was initially from the University of Queensland Boat Club.   She was selected into a New South Wales Institure of Sports program in 2021 and thereafter rowed with the Sydney University Boat Club.

Rowan first made state selection for Queensland in the 2018 women's senior eight which contested the Queen's Cup at the Interstate Regatta within the Australian Rowing Championships.  She represented again in Queensland Queen's Cup eights in 2019 and 2021.

International representative rowing
Rowan's Australian representative debut was in 2014 when she rowed in a coxless four at the World Junior Rowing Championships in Hamburg to a tenth placing. In 2018, she was selected in that Australian U23 women's eight which contested the U23 World Rowing Championships in Poznan where they made the A final and finished sixth. A few weeks earlier that crew had raced at the World Rowing Cup III.

By 2021, Rowan had switched over to sculling boats and she was Australia's sculling reserve at the delayed 2020 Tokyo Summer Olympics. In March 2022 she was selected in the Australian training squad to prepare for the 2022 international season and the 2022 World Rowing Championships.  She rowed in the Australian women's quad scull at World Rowing Cups II and III in Poznan and Lucerne.  At the 2022 World Rowing Championships at Racize, she stroked the Australian women's quad. They made the A final and finished in sixth place.

References

External links
Rowan at World Rowing

1996 births
Living people
Australian female rowers